Todd Allen Wellemeyer (born August 30, 1978) is a former right-handed pitcher in Major League Baseball. He played in the Major Leagues across eight years, for five teams, working as both a starting and relief pitcher.

Professional career

Chicago Cubs (2003-2005)
While attending Bellarmine University, he was drafted by the Chicago Cubs and remains the only Chicago Cub to earn a save in his major league debut, earning it by striking out three batters in order against Milwaukee after 17 innings of play.

Wellemeyer also picked up the win in the longest scoreless game ever played in Wrigley Field history. He struck out 4 in only 2 innings in a 1-0 marathon 16-inning game. Sammy Sosa hit a game-winning single to center field causing Preston Wilson to crash into the wall and lose the ball to win the game in the 16th inning.

Florida Marlins (2006)
Wellemeyer was traded in the offseason and appeared in 18 games before being traded to the Kansas City Royals.

Kansas City Royals (2006-2007)
Wellemeyer appeared in 28 games and had a 3.63 ERA for the Royals.

In 2007, through 10 games Wellemeyer had a 10.34 ERA and was traded to the St. Louis Cardinals.

St. Louis Cardinals (2007-2009)
After being traded by the Royals, Wellemeyer had a 3-2 record with a 3.11 ERA in 20 games (11 starts).

His best season came in 2008 with the St. Louis Cardinals, when he went 13-9 with a team best (among qualified starters) 3.71 ERA. During the 2008 season he also won Pitcher of the Month honors for May, when he went 4-0 with a 2.19 ERA. He finished 2008 ranked 18th in the NL in Wins, and 16th in the NL in ERA (3.71).

In 2009, Wellemeyer had his worst full season in the Majors, posting an ERA over 5.50 and had a 7-10 record.

Wellemeyer was born on the same day as fellow pitcher Cliff Lee. He also shares a birthday with former St. Louis Cardinals teammate Adam Wainwright.

San Francisco Giants (2010)
On February 10, 2010, Wellemeyer signed a minor league contract with the San Francisco Giants, subsequently signing a major league contract for 2010 as the fifth starter.

Until his injury on June 10, 2010, Wellemeyer had nine starts posting a 3-5 record with an ERA of 5.52.  The injury opened the door for Madison Bumgarner.  Wellemeyer pitched his final game with the Giants on August 8 against the Braves.

Chicago Cubs II
On January 25, 2011, Wellemeyer signed a non-guaranteed one-year contract to return to the Chicago Cubs.

Wellemeyer retired on May 7, 2011.

Post Retirement 
Since retirement Wellemeyer has opened a number restaurants including the El Taco Luchador chain of taco restaurants. Taco Luchador is a privately held company.

See also
List of people from the Louisville metropolitan area

References

External links

1978 births
Living people
Bellarmine Knights baseball players
Chicago Cubs players
Florida Marlins players
Kansas City Royals players
San Francisco Giants players
St. Louis Cardinals players
Major League Baseball pitchers
Baseball players from Louisville, Kentucky
Eugene Emeralds players
Lansing Lugnuts players
Daytona Cubs players
West Tennessee Diamond Jaxx players
Iowa Cubs players
Springfield Cardinals players
Eastern High School (Louisville, Kentucky) alumni